Ed Wheeler may refer to:
 Ed Wheeler (1900s infielder) (1878-1960), MLB player in 1902
 Ed Wheeler (1940s infielder) (1915-1983), MLB player in 1945